Borassodendron machadonis is a species of flowering plant in the family Arecaceae. It is found in Peninsular Malaysia and Thailand. It is threatened by habitat loss. It is occasionally cultivated as an ornamental.

References

machadonis
Trees of Peninsular Malaysia
Trees of Thailand
Vulnerable plants
Taxa named by Odoardo Beccari
Taxonomy articles created by Polbot